The 2003 Canadian Mixed Curling Championship was held January 11–19 at the Abbotsford Recreation Centre in Abbotsford, British Columbia.

Nova Scotia's Paul Flemming rink beat Alberta's Shannon Kleibrink in the final. Kleibrink was the first woman to ever skip a team at the Mixed. She would go on to win the event in 2004.

Teams

Standings

Results

Draw 1

Draw 2

Draw 3

Draw 4

Draw 5

Draw 6

Draw 7

Draw 8

Draw 9

Draw 10

Draw 11

Tiebreakers

Tiebreaker #1

Tiebreaker #2

Playoffs

1 vs. 2

3 vs. 4

Semifinal

Final

External links
Event statistics

References

Canadian Mixed Curling Championship
Curling competitions in British Columbia
2003 in Canadian curling
2003 in British Columbia
Sport in Abbotsford, British Columbia
January 2003 sports events in Canada